The Holden Monaro is a rear-wheel drive coupé manufactured by General Motors Holden in Australia from 1968 to 1975 and later reintroduced from 2001 to 2005. It was also manufactured as a 4-door sedan from 1973 to 1977.

Three generations of the Monaro coupe have been produced, the first covering the HK, HT, and HG series from 1968 to 1971, the second covering the HQ and HJ series from 1971 to 1975, and the third covering the V2 and VZ series from 2001 to 2005.

The first generation Monaro coupe was also manufactured by General Motors South Africa in 1970 and 1971 in both Holden Monaro GTS and Chevrolet SS variants, utilising CKD kits imported from Australia.

The third generation Monaro coupe was manufactured not only for domestic Australian consumption but also for export as variously a Chevrolet Lumina (Middle East), Vauxhall Monaro (UK), or Pontiac GTO (USA) badged vehicle. The third generation was also 'remanufactured' in Australia by HSV (Holden Special Vehicles) from 2001 to 2006, marketed in a range of HSV-badged high performance derivatives without application of the Monaro nameplate.

First generation (1968–1971)

HK 

Named after the Monaro region in New South Wales (although pronounced differently), Holden's new coupé was introduced in July 1968 in a two-door pillarless hardtop design available in three models: base, GTS and GTS 327. The GTS versions had the full instrumentation installed which included a tachometer mounted on the centre console. This proved to be a bad location, as the driver's knee would obstruct the view and it often rattled.

The base Monaro had a standard  straight-6 engine or the extra-cost options of two versions of  straight-6 engines (Monaro GTS came standard with the more powerful 186'S' engine), and both base model and GTS could be optioned with a  Chevrolet-sourced V8 engine.

Despite the styling being unique, the Monaro nevertheless featured styling cues derived from GM designs, employing a "coke bottle" look similar to that of the Camaro, Corvair, and Nova coupés of the late 1960s.

However, as this particular V8 engine project ran behind schedule, this led to engineers remeasuring the engine bay and finding that the original measurement calculations had been incorrect, thus allowing the use of the imported Chevrolet engines.

The HK Monaro GTS327 gave Holden its first victory in the 1968 Hardie-Ferodo 500 at the hands of Bruce McPhee and co-driver Barry Mulholland. Whilst Mulholland only drove one of the total 130 race laps, McPhee drove the remainder and also scored both pole position and fastest lap of the race.

Norm Beechey drove a HK Monaro GTS327 to third place in the 1969 Australian Touring Car Championship, the first time the ATCC was held as a series rather than a single race. Beechey showed the capabilities of the Monaro when he won the final two rounds of the five-round series at Surfers Paradise and Symmons Plains.

In early 1969, the HK Monaro range was awarded Wheels magazine's Car of the Year for 1968.

HT 

In June 1969, the HK Monaro was replaced by the facelifted HT Monaro. The 'GTS 327' became the 'GTS 350' with the replacement of the Chevrolet 327 in3 (5.4 L) V8 by the  Chevrolet 350 in3 (5.7 L) V8. As the Monaro was Holden's main car in Series Production racing, this was primarily in response to Ford who had introduced the XW Falcon GTHO Phase I in 1969. There was also an automatic version of the 'GTS 350' introduced which used a lower power version of the 350 in3 (5.7 L) engine coupled to a 2-speed Powerglide transmission. HT Monaro also marked the phasing out of the 5.0-litre Chevrolet V8, and the introduction of Holden's own locally made V8 engines, the 4.2-litre 253, and the 5.0-litre 308. Late in the HT model run, a new locally produced 3-speed automatic transmission, the Trimatic, was offered as an option, although it was not available on the 'GTS 350'.

The HT Monaro can be distinguished from the HK by the adoption of plastic grilles (previously metal), two section taillights separated by a blacked out panel, a round speedometer instead of "strip" style allowing for bringing the tachometer into the main instrument cluster instead of on the floor console, rubber front suspension bushes instead of the HK's sintered bronze, and larger taillights where the turn indicators also wrapped around the now slightly undercut edges. Bodywork 'go-faster' stripe designs (delete options) varied for each series; HK stripes were offset to the driver's side of the bonnet (hood) and bootlid (trunk), the HT had two broad stripes down the centre of the car. HT also had twin air scoops / vents incorporated into their bonnet, which served no real purpose in delivering air into the engine bay.

The HT Monaro GTS350 was successful in Series Production racing. The Holden Dealer Team was formed in 1969 by longtime Ford Works Team boss Harry Firth with the team using the GTS350 in competition. The HDT entered three Monaros in the 1969 Hardie-Ferodo 500 the lead car driven by Colin Bond and Tony Roberts winning from 1968 winners Bruce McPhee and Barry Mulholland who had switched to driving a Falcon GTHO. Coming home third in the Dealer Team's 3rd Monaro was Des West and Bathurst rookie Peter Brock.

In January 1970, Bond and Roberts would win the Rothmans 12 Hour Series Production race at Surfers Paradise driving their HDT Holden Monaro.

Norm Beechey upgraded to a HT GTS350 and would win the 1970 Australian Touring Car Championship, Holden's first ever ATCC championship success. Beechey won three of the seven rounds at Bathurst, Sandown and Lakeside where he wrapped up the title. The  Monaro (which Beechey and his chief mechanic Pat Purcell had bored out from 5.7 to 6.0 litres) proved too much for the opposition which included defending champion Ian Geoghegan in his Ford Mustang, Allan Moffat in his Ford Mustang Boss 302 Trans-Am, Bob Jane's Mustang and Beechey's own teammate Jim McKeown in a Porsche 911S. Beechey's win was all the more remarkable considering he failed to finish at Warwick Farm and did not start the final round at Symmons Plains after suffering an engine failure in qualifying. He also finished 2nd to Geoghegan in round 4 at Mallala.

Beechey would continue to run the Monaro (dubbed Trans-Aus in reference to its Australian build compared to the American Trans-Am cars of his opposition) for another two seasons, though unreliability plagued the car in 1971 and 1972. Norm only finished fifth in the 1971 ATCC, winning only round two at Calder. The 1972 ATCC saw Beechey retire from the first three rounds at Symmons Plains, Calder and Bathurst before his only points for the series came from a third place in round four at Sandown Park. At the end of 1972 as a result of the Supercar scare, the Improved Production class was shut down by CAMS with a new production based Group C touring car class introduced for which the Monaro was not eligible to race.

HG 

Unveiled on 26 July 1970, the HG Monaro was the last of the original coupé design concept. HG had cleaner lines with redesigned exterior trim pieces. The HG sported different stripes (delete options) known as "sidewinder" stripes which ran along the top edge of the fenders, under the windows and finishing just before the rear pillar. The "Monaro" badge on both rear pillars was introduced to all models. For the HG GTS, the "GTS" badges now featured black paint fill, received new black-out paint on rocker panels, with the GTS 350 getting bold treatment with new "sidewinder" stripes and black bonnet scoop. "GTS 350" designations now featured gutsier decals on the fenders and boot lid. Wheel arch moldings were deleted on all models. The "GTS 350" models no longer had the 350 Chevrolet badge on the fender, but rather a bold decal stating "350" as well as blackout treatment that covered the air-vents on the bonnet. The GTS badge originally above the gills in the fenders would be removed and would now be black instead of red (with the badges being placed on the passenger side of the grille and boot). The taillights had a cleaner look and the grille was redesigned.

Most mechanical specifications remained the same as HT series, with the exception of Monaro GTS (non-350), which had softened suspension, resulting in a smoother ride. Manual HG GTS 350 retained the suspension from the HT GTS 350. Other upgrades included thicker (HT GTS 350 style) power front disc brakes, now standard for all V8 and the 6-cylinder Monaro GTS. The HG would be the final model for the generation and the last to use the original body shell.

Export program 

HT and HG series Monaro GTS coupes were assembled in South Africa from imported parts by General Motors South Africa (GMSA) at the Port Elizabeth assembly plant.< Later the HG series Monaro was assembled and sold in South Africa badged as the Chevrolet SS. At this time GMSA had made a decision to market most of its products as Chevrolets. The Chevrolet SS had revised front styling unique to that model, incorporating four headlights and large turn indicators in the front edge of the fenders above the bumper. The Holden Monaro and Chevrolet SS models were both available with Holden 308 in3 (5.0L) and the Chevrolet 350 in3 (5.7 L) engines. South African sales totalled 1,828 Monaros and 1,182 SS models.

Second generation (1971–1977)

HQ 

A completely new body design emerged with the HQ series in July 1971, including the new Monaro 'LS' (commonly believed to mean "Luxury Sports") model which featured four headlights and chrome trim rings shared with the Holden Premier sedan. There were no longer any six-cylinder versions of the Monaro GTS, just the locally manufactured  or optional  V8s or the top level GTS350 coupé, equipped with an imported  Chevrolet motor.

The base model Monaro standard engine was enlarged to  whilst the Monaro LS had a broad spectrum of engine options from a  six to the  V8. The new coupé design had a much larger rear window and a squarer rear quarter window; it was somehow seen as not as sporty looking compared to the earlier HK-HT-HG series, but is often now considered one of the best looking body designs to come from an Australian manufacturer. Taillights were now rectangular in dual-unit style, integrated into the rear bumper; they were not unlike those of the American 1969 Chevrolet Bel Air/Biscayne.  The car's styling was somewhat reminiscent of the 1970-72 Chevrolet Chevelle.

This and the fact that the same 350 engine was also available as on option in the large Statesman luxury sedan, probably contributed to a downgrade of the Monaro GTS range in muscular image terms, as did the replacement of the bigger coupés with the inline-six engine Holden Torana GTR XU-1 as the chosen GM car for Australian touring car racing. The introduction of bonnet and bootlid paint-outs in 1973 coincided with the release of the HQ Monaro GTS in four-door sedan configuration. It is generally considered that Holden created the bold contrasting paint-outs so the new Monaro GTS sedan would not be mistaken for the humble Kingswood sedan upon which it was based.

The continued erosion of the GTS350 cachet was compounded by the deletion of specific "350" decals on the post-1973 cars, with all Monaro GTS coupés and sedans now being externally labelled with the generic HQ series 'V8' bootlid badge. In the final year of HQ production, i.e. 1974, the manual-transmission version of the GTS350 was discontinued and sales of the automatic version were minimal prior to the engine option being discontinued.

A 1972 model year two-door base Monaro was used in the film Mad Max.

HJ 
Introduced in October 1974, the HJ Monaro incorporated a heavy facelift and some model rationalisation. Its front end bore a resemblance to the 1970–1972 Chevrolet Monte Carlo. The 350 V8 engine option and the base Monaro coupé were both discontinued. The Monaro GTS continued to be available as a coupé or sedan with the  V8 engine, or the optional  V8 engine. The Monaro LS coupé also continued within the range, but still with the 3.3-litre six-cylinder engine as its base power unit.

The body paint-outs were discontinued in the HJ Monaro GTS range, but for the first time, the Monaro could be specified with optional front and rear spoilers.

The HJ Monaro LS coupé is close to being the rarest regular production car ever made in Australia with only 337 units produced. The HJ Monaro GTS coupé was discontinued during 1975 due to falling demand, 606 examples of the GTS were made.

HX 
New emissions regulations heralded the mildly facelifted HX Monaro GTS sedan, announced in July 1976. The HX was quite distinguishable, with liberal splashes of black paintouts contrasted against a range of bold body colours, and a choice of traditional chrome or body painted bumper bars.

Limited Edition
Holden had a limited number of HJ coupe panel sets in 1975 and a decision was made to do something special with them. The solution was to create the Limited Edition, or LE, which was not released until 27 September 1976. More than 600 body shells were assembled at the Pagewood body plant as HJ bodies in white late in 1975, but due to delays, the HX series came around before LE production begun, thus mandating the cars to be converted to HX which meant body shell changes. Some of those bodies were utilised to build HJ coupes prior to the cessation of HJ coupe production partway through 1976 and prior to the end of the HJ series. All LE cars were painted in an exclusive metallic colour called LE Red. The LE was not badged or officially referred to as a Monaro. The LE was an amalgam of prestige and surplus parts (including an eight-track cartridge player well after cassette tapes were common), in effect a combination of Monaro GTS and Statesman Caprice components. The LE had a price tag to match: AUD$11,500. The cars were built at the now-defunct Pagewood (Sydney) plant. Production totalled 580 cars.
The distinctive US sourced honeycomb wheels fitted to the LE, which resembled those of the second generation Pontiac Firebird, were created by a plastic mould adhered to the outside of conventional steel wheel rims. These were a gold painted version of the same wheel that had been available as an option on passenger vehicles since early in the HJ series. The front end styling of this pillarless hardtop resembles a smaller-scale 1971 U.S. specification Chevrolet Caprice.

HZ 

Although the Monaro name had survived into 1977 as the HX Monaro GTS sedan, the coupé configuration was no longer in production and Holden decided to delete the Monaro name altogether from the new Holden HZ range. With the development of Radial Tuned Suspension, Holden transformed the bland characteristics of their full-size sedans and introduced a sporting variant called simply Holden GTS. Released on 5 October 1977, this HZ variant featured a four headlight grille, front and rear air dams, four-wheel disc brakes, sports wheels and a 4.2-litre V8 engine as standard equipment. The optional 5.0-litre V8 became standard in June 1978. With the November 1978 introduction of the new mid/full-size VB Commodore sedan and its availability with V8 engine, the days of the GTS appeared numbered. Production of the GTS ceased in December 1978, an estimated 1,438 were built.

Ultimately, the VB Commodore proved very popular in both six-cylinder and V8 forms, such that all full-size HZ Holden passenger cars were phased out of production in 1980. Remnants of the H-series lived on in the Holden WB series commercial vehicle range and in the revamped Statesman WB luxury sedans that were manufactured until December 1984.

Third generation (2001–2006) 

After 25 years of absence of a full-size Holden coupe, the Monaro made a return in November 2001 following the overwhelming response of the public and media to the VT-based Holden Coupé concept displayed at the 1998 Australian International Motor Show held in Sydney. The third generation of the Monaro was produced from 2001 to 2005. The HSV Coupé saw production through to June 2006, with HSV variants on sale until August 2006.

V2 

After a gestation period of 22 months (contrary to the planned 12 to 18 months) and at a cost of A$60 million, Holden launched the V2-series Monaro based on the VX-series Commodore. It was available as the CV6, with a supercharged 3.8 L V6 and 4-speed automatic transmission (production ceased in mid-2004), and as the CV8, featuring the 5.7 L LS1 V8, with a choice of either a 6-speed manual or 4-speed automatic transmission. A Series 2 model debuted in December 2002 with a revised dashboard from the VY-series, a new alloy road wheel design and new paint and trim colour choices. The CV6 model was dropped after disappointing sales (reputedly 10 times as many CV8s were built compared to CV6s) when a Series 3 model appeared in 2004.

A limited edition model called the CV8-R was introduced in July 2003, all 350 of which were made in Turbine Mica (grey metallic) paint colour. A revised CV8-R model would appear again in May 2004 (based on the Series 3 CV8), all 320 of which were made in an exclusive Pulse Red paint colour. Other unique features of the 2004 CV8-R cars included 18" five-spoke machined face alloy wheels, smoked front and rear lamp treatment, and a “Holden By Design” electric sunroof. The interior featured the centre fascia and instrument surrounds in satin finish, “Pulse Red” and black floor-mats with CV8-R logo, a unique instrument cluster with white dial-plate daytime illumination, and leather trimming for the steering wheel, handbrake and transmission selectors (matching anthracite leather was used for the sports seats and door trims, with perforated leather inserts and black stitching).

VZ 

On 12 September 2004, Holden introduced the VZ Monaro CV8 with a 15 kW increase in engine power when compared to the previous V2-series cars. The VZ series at first came in only four paint colours (Phantom, Devil, Turismo and Quicksilver) and later saw the addition of a fifth colour named Fusion, seen only in the closing of production CV8-Z model. The VZ Monaro CV8 was upgraded in other ways too, receiving a 10-speaker audio system with two built-in subwoofers, new front/rear bumper assemblies, dual exhaust system and various other small changes. The revised rear bumper, dual exhaust system, and new hood with air intakes would soon find their way onto the export Pontiac GTO. However, in July 2005, Holden announced that production of the current generation VZ Monaro CV8 would soon be coming to an end and this led to the run of a special edition model called the CV8-Z, of which 1,605 units were ultimately made.

The last Holden Monaro-badged coupé was purchased by Emerald, Queensland businessman Darryl Mattingley for A$187,355.55—around three times the normal retail price, on 19 February 2006. The car was bought through eBay, with the proceeds going to the Leukaemia Foundation.

The Holden Monaro CV8-Z was produced to farewell the legendary Monaro name, much like what had been done with the LE coupé back in 1976. Wheels magazine tested a CV8-Z in the March 2006 issue with a Ford Mustang GT and a Nissan 350Z. They summed up the test with, "The Monaro eats Mustangs and spits out Nissans. It's a class act that deserves an encore performance." The CV8-Z was offered in the same colours as the standard CV8 but to highlight the model, a new colour was introduced called 'Fusion' orange/gold metallic with unique colour matching (Fusion and black) leather interior. The CV8-Z had unique features including a sunroof, modified darkened taillights, signature black bonnet scoop accents, special engraved CV8-Z wheels, CV8-Z badging throughout the interior and gun metal chrome CV8-Z badging on the exterior. Tony Hyde, the chief engineer of Holden, announced on his retirement in 2007 that being a part of the development of modern Monaro's was his proudest achievement. He described the modern Monaro program as "pure emotion" and that his Monaro will be kept next to his 1976 Chevrolet Corvette.

Badge engineered Monaro models  (2001–2006) 

The Monaro was used as a basis for various concept cars and was used by several different brands, HSV in Australia, Chevrolet in the Middle East, Pontiac in America and Vauxhall Motors in the United Kingdom.

HSV Coupé 

The HSV Coupé is a high performance iteration which was produced by Holden Special Vehicles from 2001 to 2006. It was originally based on the Monaro V2 series but did not carry the Monaro name.

As in the case of the Commodore-based HSV sedan range, the Coupé's body was built at the Holden manufacturing plant in Elizabeth, South Australia, and then transported and modified at HSV's Clayton production facility. The initial range consisted of two models, the GTO and GTS, which were differentiated by their engine and exterior design. Externally, the GTS differed from the GTO in having contrasting colour accents on the bumpers and side skirts.

Other additions brought by the latter upgrade included a revised exhaust system and extra cabin instrumentation. Between September 2003 to July 2004, a GTO LE (Limited Edition) was also available for sale.

With the Series III upgrade, the GTS became a special order only model and was discontinued in 2004. In May of that year, HSV launched the new luxury-oriented Coupé4, which was essentially a modified GTO fitted with HSV's first all-wheel-drive system and cost A$89,950. Due to powertrain limitations, it was powered by the older  LS1 V8 engine. The all-wheel-drive system was developed in-house by HSV rather than being an adaptation of the then existing system used by Holden on its Adventra wagon or Crewman and Cross 8 utility range. Conjecture surrounds the total number of Coupé4s built, claimed to be 134 units (28 Series III models; 106 VZ; 6 pilot cars) of which 20 were exported to New Zealand available only in Phantom Black, Quicksilver and Sting Red.

The Z Series facelift of October 2004 aligned the GTO's engine output to the other HSV Z Series models. In line with the announcement made by Holden in July 2005 about the Monaro's end of production, HSV again released a GTO LE from April 2006 (featuring three body colour and stripe combinations for just 50 units in black, 25 in yellow and 25 in red) plus a final 'Signature' limited edition. The Signature Coupe'(with a total production of 70 units), announced in July 2006 and for sale in August 2006 this model would be the last monaro/GTO and last two door coupe' manufactured in Australia. This signature model retailed for A$83,990 plus on road costs when new and gained HSV's top-of-the-line AP racing brake package with coloured front six-piston calipers with 362mm cross-drilled and grooved rotors and rear four-piston calipers with 343mm cross-drilled and grooved rotors, 19 inch multi-spoke rims (found on the HSV GTS-R Coupe concept car) sunroof and unique paint scheme as standard. In recognition of the significance HSV also reversed the order of build numbers with the last signature Coupe off the manufacturing line receiving a #1/70 rather than HSV's conventional numbering system.

Other variants 

Just like HSV, independent manufacturer Corsa Specialised Vehicles (CSV) also produced its own version of the Monaro, badged the Mondo ("world" in Italian) and based on V2 series. It came in three distinctive GT models depending on engine power.

In 2003, German manufacturer Bitter Cars instead previewed a rebodied Monaro, badged as the CD II and to be fitted with a V12 engine. This project, however, never reached full production.

Export program 
The third generation Monaro was exported to several overseas markets. It was also sold, in left-hand drive, in the Middle East as the Chevrolet Lumina Coupé, and in the United States as the Pontiac GTO, reviving another classic muscle car icon. However, at least one commentator has described it as a 'flop' because of its poor US sales. It was withdrawn from the US market in 2006, although a few were still on dealers' lots in 2007.

Pontiac GTO 

The Pontiac GTO was released in 2004 and was facelifted in 2005. Complaints from American consumers about the Pontiac GTO's bland design led to the addition of twin hood scoops in 2005 with the VZ series Monaro to recall the later muscle-car variants of the late 1960s' models; the hood scoops vent in cool air to the engine bay but do not directly feed the engine. In the eyes of the Australian press, the scoops have spoiled the clean lines of the design, while the American media seemed to accept them. The 2005 and 2006 GTO also received a LS2 6.0 L engine rated at 298 kW (400 hp); the Australian HSV Coupé GTO received a similar engine in its Z series; and Vauxhall launched this as the Monaro VXR in the UK.

The 40,808th GTO built became the last Monaro-based unit built by Holden.

Vauxhall Monaro 

The Monaro was also sold in the United Kingdom as the Vauxhall Monaro where it won Top Gear magazine's best muscle car award in 2004.

Vauxhall offered the Monaro buyer a limited edition prior to discontinuation of the model: the VXR 500. In addition to this, a shorter gear linkage was added to enable quicker shifts. The resultant 0 to 62 mph (100 km/h) was 4.8 seconds.

With the end of production, Vauxhall opted to replace the Monaro in 2007 with a version of the HSV Clubsport R8 4-door sedan. The new model sports sedan is simply referred to as the Vauxhall VXR8.

Concept cars

1980s VH project 
The possibility briefly existed in the early 1980s for a revival of the Monaro badge based on a combination of the Holden VH Commodore and the Opel Monza. With serious exploration of the concept, a Monza was shipped to Australia by Peter Brock but the project was shelved as Holden was more preoccupied, at the time, with engineering work to revamp the Statesman and Gemini range as well as with the launch of the JB Camira.

1998 Coupé 
This concept car, codenamed Matilda, emerged 20 years after the last Monaro coupé. Publicly displayed at the 1998 Sydney Motor Show, the two-door Coupé was based on the then existing VT-series Holden Commodore, which, in turn, was based on a modified platform of the European Opel Omega B. Journalists quickly christened it the Monaro and orders came flooding in, thus encouraging Holden to produce it. The production model the third generation Monaro, known as the V2 series was eventually launched in 2001, by then based on the Holden VX Commodore.

2002 HRT 427 
Displayed at the 2002 Sydney Motor Show, the HRT 427 based on a modified Monaro bodyshell. The MacPherson strut front suspension was replaced by an aluminium double A-arm setup with adjustable dampers and a weight reduction program including a carbon fibre bonnet and magnesium wheels brought the car's weight down to just 1575 kg (3472 lb). The name was derived from the engine used, a  (7.0-litre) V8 engine from the Corvette C5-R (based on the GM LS7 design), producing  at 6,000 rpm. This powerplant was built by Melbourne-based John Sidney Racing, renowned for its success in the Australian Sprintcar and NASCAR series. Other unique fittings included: AP Racing six-piston racing brakes, ram air induction, Motec instrument panel, two Sparco Pro 2000 seats and a half roll cage.

Originally intended to be put into production as competition against vehicles such as the Porsche 911 GT2, it soon became apparent to Holden that the high specification HRT 427 could not be built in such limited quantities for the original A$215,000 asking price. As a result, the project was eventually cancelled and all customer deposits received were refunded.

The only HRT 427's in existence are two road cars and four racing versions (the latter built by Garry Rogers Motorsport for use in the short-lived Bathurst 24 Hour race and Australian Nations Cup Championship), each of which cost about A$500,000 to build. One of these is not for sale and has remained within Holden's concept car collection. In April 2008, the other road car was sold to the Cairns car collector, Shawn Ryan. It has since been inaccurately stated in the media that he paid the record-breaking price of A$920,000, making it the most expensive Australian car ever sold. In reality, however, the quoted price tag was for both an HRT 427 and the first HSV VS GTS-R ever built. The portion of that figure attributable to the HRT 427 is $710,000, which was the amount the then owner received before commission to the sales agent. In June 2010, the concept car was re-sold at auction in Sydney to an anonymous Queensland buyer at the far lower price of A$350,000. The four racing cars have likewise made their way into collections, with their racing careers shortened by regulation changes.

The interest in the HRT 427 was such that, in 2008, its spiritual production version became the HSV W427 sedan built to celebrate HSV's 20th anniversary. In addition, in 2004, a more affordable racing coupé version reemerged in the form of the HSV GTS-R.

2004 Convertible 
The Holden Monaro four-seater convertible, codenamed Marilyn, was a fully operational one-off concept car, it was never intended to reach production. It was built in 2002 in left hand drive by TWR Engineering at a reported cost of A$2 million and shown at the 2004 Sydney Motor Show.

2004 HSV GTS-R 
The HSV GTS-R concept car, codenamed P120, was unveiled at the 2004 Sydney Motor Show. Similarities could be drawn with the HRT 427, however, the GTS-R was never intended for road-use but for a one-make racing series. Its more aggressive appearance was achieved through the use of a large front airdam, xenon headlights, LED rear lights, active carbon fiber rear spoiler and rear diffuser. Other features included carbon ceramic disc brakes, rollcage, side-exiting exhausts and 19-inch ROH alloy wheels. The concept never reached production.

2008 Coupé 60 

This VE Commodore-based concept was presented at the Melbourne Motorshow in 2008 to celebrate Holden's 60th anniversary. It cost A$2.5 million to build but never reached production.

2013 VF project 
In 2013, the Australian media became aware of a "VF Monaro" digital rendering posted online by design firm, Dsine International, which also saw the input of Holden designers, Simon Gow and Peter Hughes. It remained only a rendering with no production prospects, thanks to the existence, at that time, of the larger volume selling fifth-generation Chevrolet Camaro, which was based on the same Zeta platform of the VE-VF Commodore.

Motorsport 

A pair of Monaro GT racecars powered by an Australian built version of the 427 cu in Corvette C5-R engine was built by Garry Rogers Motorsport (GRM) to compete in the Australian Nations Cup Championship and won the 2002 and 2003 Bathurst 24 Hour races. This car is often confused for being the 'track' version of the HRT 427, but the racing program headed by then-Holden Motorsport Manager John Stevenson was announced many months before the HRT 427 was revealed to the press and public.

In fact, the first GRM-built car in 'nuclear banana' yellow underwent shakedown laps at Calder Park before a half day's testing at Winton wearing the race number "427". It was then shown to the media and public at the Bathurst 1000 race a week before the HRT 427 was unveiled at the 2002 Sydney Motor Show. Much to the displeasure of V8 Supercars event organisers, Garth Tander drove a lap of the Mt Panorama circuit in the rain, as part of Holden Motorsport's buying track time to promote the 'rival' 24 Hour race event. So as not to preempt the HRT 427's launch the following week, for its sneak Bathurst 1000 unveiling, the yellow Monaro wore the Tander's GRM V8 Supercar race number "34" before reverting to "427" for the 24 Hour race.

The HRT 427 won both the first and last races it competed in. Garth Tander, Steven Richards, Cameron McConville and Nathan Pretty drove the car to a debut win in the 2002 Bathurst 24 Hour, while James Brock son of legendary driver Peter Brock drove the third and last 427 Monaro built by GRM to victory in the final race of the 2004 Nations Cup at the Mallala Circuit in South Australia.

References

External links 

Monaro
Cars introduced in 1968
1960s cars
1970s cars
2000s cars
Coupés
Muscle cars
Cars of Australia
Rear-wheel-drive vehicles